Warren Township, Indiana may refer to one of the following places:

 Warren Township, Clinton County, Indiana
 Warren Township, Huntington County, Indiana
 Warren Township, Marion County, Indiana
 Warren Township, Putnam County, Indiana
 Warren Township, St. Joseph County, Indiana
 Warren Township, Warren County, Indiana

See also

Warren Township (disambiguation)

Indiana township disambiguation pages